The 1879 Hutt by-election was a by-election held in the single-member  electorate during the 6th New Zealand Parliament, on 2 July 1879.

The by-election was caused by the resignation of the incumbent MP William Fitzherbert when he was appointed to the Legislative Council. He was replaced by Henry Jackson.

Results

References

Hutt 1879
1879 elections in New Zealand
July 1879 events
1870s in Wellington